Bright Moments may refer to:

 Bright Moments (Rahsaan Roland Kirk album)
 Bright Moments (Max Roach album)